Sonamos Pese A Todo, the debut album of Les Luthiers, released in September, 1971. It was recorded in late 1970 at ION Studios in Buenos Aires, and it featured Les Luthiers as a quintet, with some guest musicians and an orchestra for some numbers. The album was done before they collectively credited their works to everybody in the group, so individual authorship is included. Ernesto Acher wasn't a member of Les Luthiers when they recorded the project, but he was instrumental in getting the album released.

Track listing

Side one
 "Presentación" (text: Marcos Mundstock)
 "El alegre cazador que vuelve a su casa con un fuerte dolor acá" (music: Gerardo Masana)
 "Conozca el interior" (lyrics: Marcos Mundstock; music: Gerardo Masana)
 "El polen ya se esparce por el aire" (lyrics: Marcos Mundstock; music: Gerardo Masana)
 "Cantata de la planificación familiar" (lyrics & music: Carlos Núñez Cortés)
 "Concerto grosso alla rústica" (music: Carlos Núñez Cortés)

Side two
 "Quinteto de vientos" (music: Gerardo Masana)
 "Oi Gadóñaya" (music: traditional; lyrics: Marcos Mundstock; choral arrangement: Carlos Núñez Cortés)
 "Epopeya de Edipo de Tebas" (lyrics: Marcos Mundstock; music: Carlos Núñez Cortés)
 "Candonga de los colectiveros" (lyrics: Marcos Mundstock; music: Jorge Maronna)
 "Teorema de Thales" (lyrics & music: Carlos Núñez Cortés)
 "Gloria Hosanna, that's the question" (lyrics & music: Carlos Núñez Cortés)

With exception of 'Concerto Grosso...' and 'Presentación', all the numbers had been performed by Les Luthiers long before the recordings took place. Carlos Núñez Cortés acted as musical conductor and Marcos Mundstock wrote all the introductory texts. Carlos López Puccio (who would be later a member of the group) was a guest musician on this record.

Les Luthiers albums
1971 debut albums